I'm Going Out for Cigarettes (French: Je Sors Acheter des Cigarettes) is a 2018 animated short film directed by Osman Cerfon. The film has been nominated and awarded in many festivals including Locarno International Film Festival and the Animator International Animated Film Festival where it received the Oscar-qualifying Grand Jury Prize.

It was nominated at the 47th Annie Awards in the Best Animated Short Subject category and at the 45th César Award ceremony.

Plot 
Jonathan, twelve years old, lives with his sister, his mother and also some men. They all have the same face and nest in closets, drawers, TV set...

Awards & Nominations
Since its launch the film has been selected in more than 140 festivals worldwide.

See also 
 2018 in film

References

External links 

 I'm Going Out for Cigarettes on Miyu Distribution's official Vimeo channel
 

2018 animated films
2018 films
2010s animated short films
2018 short films
French animated short films
2010s French films